"Sing Out!" is the 23rd single by Japanese idol girl group Nogizaka46. The center position of the title track is held by Asuka Saito. It was released on 29 May  2019. It reached number-one on the weekly Oricon Singles Chart with 1,004,000 copies sold.
It was also number-one on the Billboard Japan Hot 100.

Release 
This single was released in 5 versions. Type-A, Type-B, Type-C, Type-D and a regular edition.

Track listing
All lyrics written by Yasushi Akimoto.

Type-A

Type-B

Type-C

Type-D

Regular Edition

Participating members

"Sing Out!" 
Center: Asuka Saitō

3rd Row: Sayuri Inoue, Kaede Satō, Ayane Suzuki, Renka Iwamoto, Tamami Sakaguchi, Miria Watanabe, Riria Itō, Mai Shinuchi 

2nd Row: Minami Umezawa, Hinako Kitano, Manatsu Akimoto, Shiori Kubo, Sayuri Matsumura, Minami Hoshino, Reika Sakurai

1st Row: Momoko Ōzono, Miona Hori, Erika Ikuta, Asuka Saitō, Mai Shiraishi, Kazumi Takayama, Yūki Yoda

Chart performance

Oricon

Billboard Japan

Year-end

References

2019 singles
2019 songs
Japanese-language songs
Nogizaka46 songs
Oricon Weekly number-one singles
Billboard Japan Hot 100 number-one singles
Songs with lyrics by Yasushi Akimoto